Ors is a commune in the Nord department in northern France.

It is located on the Sambre–Oise Canal, in a small wood called Bois l'Évêque.

History
The commune was an area of intense fighting in November 1918 for control of the canal. Second Lieutenant Wilfred Owen was killed in action there, a week before the Armistice, and is buried at the Communal Cemetery beside many of his men. The village's new (2014) primary school is named for Owen.

Ors is famous for its yearly water jousting competition on the canal every August 15. Water jousting has been played there since the Middle Ages.

Heraldry

Monuments
The church, Église de l'Assomption, was built from 1851 to 1872.

See also
Communes of the Nord department

References

External links

 Ors Communal Cemetery on the website "Remembrance Trails of the Great War in Northern France"
Société des Jouteurs Sauveteurs d'Ors

Communes of Nord (French department)